Cat tails, cattail, or cat's tails are common names for several plants and may refer to:

Various species in the genus Acalypha, particularly
Acalypha hispida
Various species in the genus Bulbinella
Various species in the genus Typha
"Cattails", a song by Big Thief from their album U.F.O.F.
"Cattails", an indie video game made by Falcon Development.

See also
 Ptilotus, pussy tails